Bellamy Road (foaled April 5, 2002) is an American Thoroughbred racehorse and the winner of the 2005 Wood Memorial Stakes. He was owned by the Kinsman Stable, the nom de course of George Steinbrenner, principal owner and managing partner of the New York Yankees baseball team.

Career

Bellamy Road's first race was on August 3, 2004 at Delaware Park, where he came in first. He won his next race, the 2004 Cradle Stakes on September 6, 2004.

He competed in the 2004 Breeders' Futurity Stakes, but came in seventh. He rebounded with a win at Gulfstream Park on March 12, 2005, and then won the 2005 Wood Memorial Stakes. This proved to be the last win of his career.

He was considered a favorite for the 2005 Kentucky Derby, but finished seventh. He then ended his career with a second place finish in the 2005 Travers Stakes.

Stud career
Bellamy Road's descendants include:

c = colt, f = filly, g = gelding

Pedigree

References

2002 racehorse births
Thoroughbred racehorses
Racehorses bred in Florida
Racehorses trained in the United States
American racehorses